Despicable Me 2: Original Motion Picture Soundtrack is the soundtrack album for the 2013 film Despicable Me 2; the sequel to Despicable Me (2010). The album was released on July 2, 2013, through Back Lot Music. The original music was composed by Heitor Pereira and Pharrell Williams, whom previously scored for Despicable Me. The soundtrack to the film featured 24 tracks – eight songs and the remainder of the album, consists of original score tracks. Out of the eight songs, three original tracks, written by Williams, were featured in the album as well as the tracks "Another Irish Drinking Song", "I Swear" and "Y.M.C.A." were incorporated into the album. Besides that, two tracks from Despicable Me: "Fun, Fun, Fun" and the titular track is also featured in the soundtrack.

The track "Happy" served as the only single from the album released on November 21, 2013 by Back Lot Music, and was also part of Williams' second studio album Girl (2014). A visual presentation of the track, being advertised as "the world's first 24-hour music video" coincided the single, featuring Williams and directed by We Are from LA, and went viral upon release. Besides, topping the charts in over 19 countries, it was the best-selling song of 2014 in the United States and United Kingdom. The song also received an Academy Award-nomination for Best Original Song at the 86th Academy Awards, but lost the award to "Let It Go" from Frozen. Eight years after the single release, the track "Just a Cloud Away" was released in March 2022.

Background 
The co-director of Despicable Me 2, Chris Renaud had recalled the "distinctive music of the first film" that born out of the collaboration between Pereira and Williams, leading them to work for its sequel. Pereira attributed that for El Macho, being a Mexican wrestler and the main antagonist, had to implement "full choir with a latin flair to emphasize his presence". Pereira also created new themes for the characters, including for the minions, whose themes needed to be "more threatening and menacing". Williams and Pereira discussed about several main themes for the album, and went ahead with the overarching theme, which was not about the characters but much about the air of the film. He added that the "continuity was honestly based on lifting people up emotionally".

Williams wrote three original songs, including the popular track "Happy" that was released as a single on November 21, 2013 to wider commercial success. In a 2014 interview to The New York Times, Williams recalled that the song was rejected nine times, by the producer Chris Meledandri, before finally being approved. While writing the track, did not write the melodic portions, but only just the chorus part of the film. He finished writing the song within 20 minutes. The song was initially intended to be written for CeeLo Green (who earlier sang another track "Scream"), but due to conflicts with CeeLo's record company Elektra Records, as he was on the verge of releasing his 2013 Christmas album, Williams himself sang the track, instead.

Speaking on the integration of the film songs into the score, Pereira said "Unless there is a reason in the story, you don't want it to be a surprise, so you have to tease the ears with what is going to come in the song before it begins".

Promotions and marketing 
As a part of promotions, Williams came up with a website 24hoursofhappy.com, launched to coincide with the single release, featuring a visual presentation of "Happy" advertised as being "the world's first 24-hour music video", directed by the French directing team We Are from LA. The video went viral upon its premiere, and attributed to the massive success of the song. The four-minute video edit of the song released on YouTube on November 21, and as of March 2018, it crossed over 1 billion views. Eight years after the film's release, Williams released the lyrical song "Just a Cloud Away" on March 25, 2022 to wider commercial response.

Track listing

Commercial performance 
"Happy" topped the musical charts in over 19 countries. It topped the US Billboard Hot 100 for the week ending March 8, 2014, and the following week, and also topped the Hot 100 Airplay chart. It holds the record for the second-highest audience peak for a week on the Hot 100 Airplay, with 225.9 million impressions, only behind Robin Thicke's "Blurred Lines". It also topped the New Zealand Singles Chart holding the first position for 12 consecutive weeks, since January 2014, and broke the 36-year-long record for most weeks spent at #1, which was previously held by Boney M.'s 1970 single "Rivers of Babylon". It also became the best-selling single of UK and US in 2014, with 1.5 and 6.45 million copies sold for the year, respectively.

The soundtrack consecutively listed in the first 10 positions of the UK Soundtracks Chart by the Official Charts Company. It also topped the 86th position in Billboard 200, and further listed in number 19 in the Independent Albums chart and in the top-third of Billboard soundtracks chart, since 2014.

Chart positions

Accolades 

At the 86th Academy Awards held on March 2, 2014, Williams' song "Happy" was nominated for Best Original Song, but lost to "Let It Go" from Frozen. When GQ magazine asked Williams "how badly" he wanted the Oscar, he responded: "When they read the results, my face was...frozen. But then I thought about it, and I just decided just to... let it go."

The music video for "Happy" was nominated for Best Male Video and Video of the Year at the 2014 MTV Video Music Awards. It also won the Grammy Award for Best Music Video at the 57th Annual Grammy Awards, and in the same ceremony, a live rendition of the song, won the Grammy Award for Best Pop Solo Performance. However, the song failed to shortlist at the Best Song Written for Visual Media category.

Personnel credits 
Credits adapted from CD liner notes:

Soundtrack 

 Original songs written, composed and produced by: Pharrell Williams
 Incorporated tracks produced by: Ali Dee Theodore
 Arrangements: Andrew Coleman
 Edited by: Andrew Coleman
 Mixed by: Leslie Brathwaite, Fabian Marasciullo
 Recorded by: Andrew Coleman, Sean Phelan, Mike Larson, Eric Liljestrand
 Music assistance: John Connolly, Matthew Desrameaux, Sebastian Zuleta, Elizabeth Gallardo, Ghazi Hourani, Josh Gudwin, Brandon Jones

 Newman Scoring Stage sessions

 Concertmaster: Norman Hughes
 Contractor: Suzie Katayama
 Orchestra leader: Bruce Fowler
 Instruments
 Cello: Dane Little, Erika Duke, Rudolph Stein, Stefanie Fife
 Drums: Curt Bisquera
 Marimba: Dan Greco
 Trombone: Alan Kaplan, Philip Teele, Steven Holtman
 Trumpet: John Fumo, Walter Fowler, Warren Luening
 Tuba: William Roper
 Violin: Alan Grunfeld, Gerardo Hilera, Mario De Lion, Natalie Leggett, Philip Vaiman, Susan Chatman, Vladimir Polimatidi

 Vocalists

 Backing vocalists: Ashley L. Lee, Jasmine Murray, Rhea Dummett, Shamika Hightower, Terrence Rolle, Trevon Henderson (track 4)
 Vocals: Centre For Young Musicians (track 9)

Score 

 Original score composed and produced by: Heitor Pereira, Pharrell Williams
 Additional arrangements: Anthony Willis, Bobby Tahouri
 Additional composition: Azeo Torre, Cameron Hotchkis, Sebastian Zuleta, Ted Reedy
 Recorded by: Alan Meyerson, Kevin Globerman
 Edited by: Slamm Andrews
 Mixed by: Alan Meyerson
 Mixing assistance: Christian Wenger
 Mastered by: Reuben Cohen
 Music supervisor: Rachel Levy
 Music contractor: Peter Rotter
 Scoring crew: Denis St. Amand, Tim Lauber, Tom Steel

 Choir

 Contractor: Jasper Randall
 Bass vocals: Alvin Chea, Bob Joyce, Eric Bradley, Greg Davies, Gregg Geiger, Jim Campbell, Jules Green, Mark Edward Smith, Michael Geiger, Stephen Grimm, Steve Pence, Will Goldman
 Soprano vocals: Cindy O'connor, Holly Sedillos, Jenny Graham, Jessica Rotter, Karen Whipple Schnurr, Suzanne Waters, Teri Koide
 Tenor vocals: Aj Teshin, Chris Mann, Dick Wells, Fletcher Sheridan, Gerald White, Jasper Randall, Jeff Gunn, Joseph Golightly, John Kimberling, Sean Mcdermott, Steve Amerson, Steven Harms
 Child vocalists: Alaman Diadhou, Aria Gunn, Catherine Matthews, Christian Mancuso, Cole Konis, Emily Titman, Emma Gunn, Hannah Messinger, Joe Matthews, Joss Saltzman, Karissa Lee, Levi Gunn, Marlowe Peyton, Mason Purece, Max Kilpatrick, Merit Leighton

 Newman Scoring Stage sessions

 Concertmaster: Norman Hughes
 Contractor: Suzie Katayama
 Conductor: Nick Glennie-Smith
 Orchestra leader: Bruce Fowler
 Orchestrator: Ladd McIntosh
 Instruments
 Bass: Nico Abondolo, Adam Blackstone, David Parmeter, Drew Dembowski, Edward Meares, John Leftwich, Steve Dress, Timothy Lefebvre
 Bassoon: Rose Corrigan, Ken Munday
 Cello: Steve Erdody, Andrew Shulman, Armen Ksajikian, Cecilia Tsan, Christina Soule, Dennis Karmazyn, Erika Duke-Kirkpatrick, George Kim Scholes, John Walz, Paula Hochhalter, Tim Landauer, Trevor Handy
 Clarinet: Stuart Clark, Dan Higgins, Greg Huckins, Jeff Driskill
 Flute: Geraldine Rotella, Daniel Higgins, Jeff Driskill, Stephan Kujala
 Guitar: Clay Sears, John McCurry
 Horn: James Thatcher, Allen Fogle, Brian O'connor, Daniel Kelley, Dylan Hart, Jennie Kim, Laura Brenes, Mark Adams, Steve Becknell, Yvonne Suzette Moriarty
 Keyboards: Darek Cline Cobbs, Sarah Schmidt
 Oboe: Phil Ayling, Chris Bleth
 Percussion: Aaron Draper, Marvin B. Gordy III, Michael Klein, Steve McKie, Zachary Danziger
 Trombone: Alexander Iles, Alan Kaplan, William Reichenbach, Charlie Morillas, Phillip Teele, Phillip Keen, Steven Holtman
 Trumpet: Jon Lewis, Aaron Smith, Bijon Watson, Daniel Fornero, Daniel Rosenboom, David Washburn, Gary Grant, Jose Hernandez, Rick Baptist, Wayne Bergeron
 Tuba: Doug Tornquist, Gary Hickman
 Viola: Brian Dembow, Andrew Duckles, Darrin Mc Cann, David Walther, Matthew Funes, Robert Brophy, Roland Kato, Shawn Mann, Victoria Miskolczy
 Violin: Bruce Dukov, Julie Gigante, Alyssa Park, Ana Landauer, Charlie Bisharat, Darius Campo, Eun-Mee Ahn, Helen Nightengale, Irina Voloshina, Jay Rosen, Jessica Guideri, Josefina Vergara, Katia Popov, Kevin Connolly, Lisa Liu, Maya Magub, Natalie Leggett, Phillip Levy, Roger Wilkie, Sara Parkins, Sarah Thornblade, Serena Mc Kinney, Tamara Hatwan, Tereza Stanislav

 Featured instrumentalists

 Percussion: MB Gordy
 Bass: John Leftwich
 Trumpet: Bijon Watson, Dan Fernero, Rick Baptist, Wayne Bergeron

 Management

 Executive producer: Chris Meledandri
 Executive in charge of music: Michael Knobloch
 Music business affairs: Philip M. Cohen
 Music preparation: Booker White
 Product manager: Jake Voulgarides
 Design: Jennifer Wroblewski, Ken Matsubara, Peter Lung

Notes

References 

2013 soundtrack albums
Back Lot Music soundtracks
Despicable Me
Heitor Pereira albums
Pharrell Williams albums
Albums produced by Pharrell Williams